East Halmahera Regency is a regency of Halmahera in North Maluku Province of Indonesia. It covers a land area of 6,538.10 km2, and it had a population of 72,880 at the 2010 Census and 91,707 at the 2020 Census; the official estimate as at mid 2021 was 92,954. The capital lies at the town of Maba in Kota Maba District.

Administration
The regency is divided into ten districts (kecamatan), tabulated below with their areas and their populations at the 2010 Census and the 2020 Census, togethyer with the official estimate as at mid 2021. The table also includes the locations of the district administrative centres, the number of villages (rural desa and urban kelurahan) in each district, and its post code. The five Maba Districts comprise the southeastern half of the regency and the five Wasile Districts comprise the northwestern half.

References

External links

Regencies of North Maluku
Halmahera